James Dawkins may refer to:

 James Dawkins (antiquarian) (1722–1757), MP for Woodstock and Hindon, antiquarian and Jacobite
 James Dawkins (died 1766) (c. 1696–1766), English landowner and politician
 James Dawkins (politician) (c.1760–1843), MP for Chippenham 1784–1806 and 1807–1812, Hastings 1812–1826 and Wilton 1831–1832
 James Baird Dawkins (1820–1883), prominent Confederate politician
 James C. Dawkins, United States Air Force general 
James Dawkins, drummer of The Trinity Band in England
 Jimmy Dawkins (1936–2013), American blues guitarist